Third World approaches to international law is a critical school of international legal scholarship and an intellectual and political movement. It is a "broad dialectic opposition to international law", which perceives international law as facilitating the continuing exploitation of the Third World through subordination to the West. TWAIL scholars (known as TWAIL-ers) seek to change what they identify as international law's oppressive aspects, through the re-examination of the colonial foundations of international law.

History

Early origins (Generation I) 
TWAIL was inspired by the decolonization movements that occurred after World War II in Latin America, Africa, and Asia. Symbolically, the conference held in Bandung, Indonesia, in 1955 is seen as the birthplace of TWAIL, as it was the first attempt by African and Asian states to create a coalition to address the issues specific to the Third World. TWAIL came about to address the material and ethical concerns as well as hardships of the Third World.

New age movement (Generation II) 

The study of TWAIL and its organization originated from a group of Harvard Law School graduate students in 1996. Subsequent to a conference regarding post-colonialism, critical race theory and law and development studies held at Harvard Law School in December 1995, graduate students held a meeting to analyze the viability of creating third world approaches to international law. TWAIL scholars have subsequently held conferences at various universities:
Harvard Law School, 1997 
Osgoode Hall Law School, 2001
Albany Law School, 2007
University of British Columbia, 2008
Université Paris 1 Panthéon-Sorbonne, 2010
University of Oregon Law School, 2011
American University in Cairo, 2015
 Faculty of Law, University of Colombo, 2017
 Faculty of Law, National University of Singapore, 2018
UCLA School of Law, 2019

Objectives 

TWAIL's main objectives include:
Developing an understanding as to how international law perpetuates the subordination of non-Europeans to Europeans through international legal norms.
Creating opportunities for Third World participation in international law.
Proposing an alternative mechanism of international law that coexists with other critiques of the neoliberal approach to international law
Eradicating underdevelopment of the Third World through scholarship, policy, and politics 
Understanding and engaging Third World scholarship in the analysis of international law.

Concepts

Third World 

The Third World according to TWAIL-ers, is a group of states, which are politically, economically, and culturally diverse, but are simultaneously united in their common history of colonialism. TWAIL emphasizes that even after the end of the Cold War, the Third World is still a political reality. Some TWAIL-ers believe this distinction to be even more alive today, due to the aggregation of diversification of states based on economic development. They underline that the maintenance of the unity of the Third World is crucial in combating the continuing domination of the First World and that the term has no pejorative connotation. The First World is considered to be the group of states engaged in imperial practices and which continue to dominate global politics and economics.

Approaches 

TWAIL reconsiders the history and development of international law and highlights the colonial legacy inherent in it. TWAIL reevaluates the power relationships of the current world order to eradicate the racial hierarchy and oppression present in international law. Although the goal is common, the methods employed to effect those changes vary. Hence, TWAIL is a diverse and ‘coalitionary movement’ - its scholars use different methodologies like Marxism, feminism and critical race theory. Therefore, there is no elaborate common TWAIL doctrine, but all TWAIL-ers are nevertheless united in their struggle for the greater involvement of Third World peoples in international law.

International Law 

TWAIL-ers underline that international law was created during the colonial era and that it was used to legitimize the global processes of marginalization and domination of the colonized people by Western powers. They refuse to accept the universal character of the international legal system, as it emerged solely from the European and Christian tradition. In contrast, Third World countries were assimilated by force into the international legal system, which does not reflect their diverse heritage. TWAIL-ers reject the idea that after the end of World War II international law has moved on from its imperialistic origins. Although the system appears to be legitimized by recognizing human rights and the right to self-determination, TWAIL-ers believe that international law is still a tool of oppression and that decolonization processes were merely illusory. Amongst the modern forms of domination, TWAIL-ers include:

The limitation of the Third World states’ sovereignty through transferring their autonomous powers to international institutions controlled by the First World,
the arbitrary application of the humanitarian intervention and
the internationalization of proprietary rights.

TWAIL-ers also emphasizes the inability of Third World leaders to secure the interests of their people and their failed opposition to the First World hegemony, which further hinders the struggle for the liberation of Third World peoples. However, TWAIL highlights that some concepts in international law simultaneously serve as both an instrument of oppression and emancipation – like the international human rights regime, which not only justifies the internationalization of property rights but also the protection of peoples’ freedoms. Hence TWAIL-ers recognize that some elements of the system need to be preserved.

Scholars 

TWAIL is not a uniform school of thought and TWAIL-ers do not take a unanimous stance. Some of them are more reconstructionist while others are more oppositional in their approach. Nevertheless, the scholars, in a decentralized network, share a common concern for the Third World. Some of them teach TWAIL courses at various universities around the world.

First Generation 

 R.P. Anand
 Upendra Baxi
 Mohammed Bedjaoui
 Keba M’baye
 Christopher Weeramantry

Second Generation  

 Antony Anghie
 Aslı Ü. Bâli
 Balakrishnan Rajagopal
 Basil Ugochukwu
 Bhupinder Chimni
 Celestine Nyamu
 Usha Natarajan
 James Thuo Gathii
 Joel Ngugi
 Makau Wa Mutua
 Mohsen Al Attar
 Obiora Chinedu Okafor
 Sylvia Tamale
 Vasuki Nesiah
 E. Tendayi Achiume
 Khaled Al-Kassimi
 Jelena Aparac
 Michael Fakhri
 Sujith Xavier
 Amar Bhatia
 John Reynolds
 Ntina Tzouvala
 Luis Eslava
 Sundhya Pahuja
 José-Manuel Barreto
 George R.B. Galindo
 Jennifer L Beard

Criticism 
TWAIL-ers are sometimes accused of having a nihilistic approach. David P. Fidler and Jose Alvarez criticize TWAIL for offering no positive agenda for action or reform in international law and relations. Alvarez uses the example of the genocide in Sudan and TWAIL-ers’ refusal to subscribe to the lobbying of the Security Council to take the desired action in the case. Alvarez's own work contains many TWAIL-like themes and he has often been just as critical of certain liberal approaches to international law as TWAIL scholarship has been.  Post-structuralist critiques of TWAIL assert that the argumentative logic of TWAIL ultimately operates according to the very conservative analytical framework it sets out to transcend.

It has also be pointed out that the TWAIL movement, itself, was shaped by Europeans and North Americans, while purporting to speak on behalf of the "Third World".

In a recent 2020 study, the TWAIL movement was criticised in relation to it justifying Civilizational Colonialism in the sensitive areas of High Asia (a metaphoric categorisation) in which many areas were included like Kashmir, Hazara, Nuristan, Laghman, Azad Kashmir, Jammu, Himachal Pradesh, Ladakh, Gilgit Baltistan, Chitral, Western Tibet, Western Xinjiang, Badakhshan, Gorno Badakhshan, Fergana, Osh and Turkistan Region. These rich resource areas are surrounded by the five major mountainous systems of Tien Shan, Pamirs, Karakoram, Hindu Kush and Western Himalayas and the three main river systems of Amu Darya, Syr Darya and Indus. The work highlights the role of United States, China, Russia, UK, India, Pakistan, Afghanistan, Kazakhstan, Uzbekistan, Kyrgyzstan, Tajikistan, Turkey, Iran and other players involved in The New Great Game over who will dominate High Asia. The work criticises TWAILers for ignoring sensitive areas like these and further tries to explore Pan-High Asianism and High Asian Approaches to International Law (HAAIL) as the potential way forward for the region which can be sub-categorised into the Western Pahari, Greater Dardic, Trans-Himalayan, Badakhshan and Sogdiana Belts.

See also 
 Public International Law
 Marxism
 Critical race theory
 Feminist theory 
 Decolonization 
 Human Rights
 First World
 Third World
 History of public international law

External links 
 http://waynemorsecenter.uoregon.edu/conferences-symposia/twail/twail-primer/
 http://www.twail.net
 http://opiniojuris.org/2007/04/18/twail-iii-the-third-world-and-international-law/

References

Footnotes

Bibliography 
Guy Anker; Global Communication without Universal Civilization. V.I: Coexisting Contemporary Civilizations: Arabo-Muslim, Bharati, Chinese, and Western. INUPRESS, Geneva, 2000, 501 p. .
A. Anghie; B.S. Chimni (2003) "Third World Approaches to International Law and Individual Responsibility in Internal Conflicts", Chinese Journal of International Law 2(1): pp. 77–103.
B.S. Chimni (2006) "Third World Approaches to International Law: Manifesto", International Community Law Review 8: pp. 3–27.
 B.S. Chimni (ed.) (2011) Third World Approaches to International Law, 3:1 Trade, Law and Development.
D.P. Fidler, (2003) "Revolt Against or From Within the West? TWAIL, the Developing World, and the Future Direction of International Law", 2(1) Chinese Journal of International Law 29.
H. Richardson III, (2003) "U.S. Hegemony, Race and Oil in Deciding United Nations Security Council Resolution 1441 on Iraq", 17 TEMP. INT’L & COMP. L.J. 27.
J. Alvarez, (2003) "Hegemonic International Law Revisited", 97 AM. J. INT’L L. 881 Hereinafter: Alvarez Hegemonic IL.
J. Alvarez, (2010) "My Summer Vacation Part II: Revisiting TWAIL in Paris".
J. T. Gathii (2011) "TWAIL: A Brief History of its Origins, its Decentralized Network and a Tentative Bibliography", Trade, Law and Development, 3 (1): pp. 26–48.
K. Mickelson, (2008) "Taking Stock of TWAIL Histories", 10 INT. COMMUNITY L. REV. 355.
L. Eslava, and S.  Pahuja, (2011). "Between Resistance and Reform: TWAIL and the Universality of International Law", Trade, Law and Development 3(1). 
M. Mutua, (2000) "What is TWAIL?", Proceedings of the 94th Annual Meeting of the American Society of International Law: pp. 31–40.
M.W. Janis, (1983) "Towards a New International Order by Mohammed Bedjaoui", 6 B.C. INT’L & COMP. L. REV. 355.
O. Okafor, (2005). "Newness, Imperialism, and International Legal Reform in Our Time: A TWAIL Perspective", Osgoode Hall Law Journal 43(1 & 2).
M. Fakhri, (2012). "Questioning TWAIL's Agenda", 14:1 Oregon Review of International Law 1.

Critical legal studies
International law literature
Third-Worldism